Wild Horses – The Nashville Album is the seventeenth studio album by British rock band Smokie, released on 25 February 1998 by CMC Records.

Track listing
"Desperate Measures" (Chuck Jones, Greg Swint) – 3:46
"Wrong Reasons" (Duet with Maggie Reilly) (Rick Giles, Winston Sela) – 3:59
"And the Night Stood Still" (Diane Warren) – 4:02
"She Rides Wild Horses" (Ted Hewitt, Bob Corbin) – 3:30
"When It's the Right Time" (Taylor Rhodes, James Dean Hicks) – 3:49
"Looking for You" (Jess Brown, Jim Denton) – 4:15
"Ain't It Funny How It Works" (John Jarrard, George Teren) – 3:02
"All She Ever Really Wanted" (Steve Seskin, Al Anderson) – 2:56
"No Rest for the Wounded Heart" (Curt Cuomo, Robert Tepper) – 5:33
"When the Walls Come Down" (Kim Carnes, Greg Barnhill) – 3:59
"Goodbye Yesterday's Heartache" (Jim Daddario, Greg Barnhill) – 4:01
"If You Think You Know How to Love Me" (US version) (Mike Chapman, Nicky Chinn) – 5:27

Personnel

Smokie
Mike Craft – lead vocal and guitar
Terry Uttley – bass and vocals
Martin Bullard – keyboards
Steve Pinnell – drums and percussion
Mick McConnell – guitars and vocals

Additional musicians
Paul Franklin – steel guitar

Production
Produced by Barry Beckett
Production coordinator – Regena Warden
Recorded at Mastertonics Studios in Nashville, Tennessee by Pete Greene, assisted by David Boyer
Special computer editing – David Boyer
Mixed at Iliad Studios in Nashville, Tennessee by Pete Greene, assisted by David Boyer and John Koontz
Mastered at Gateway Mastering in Portland, Maine by Brian K. Lee
"Wrong Reasons" recorded at Mastertonics Studios / Townhouse Studios in London
Mixed at Iliad Studios
Additional mix at Puk Recording Studio in Denmark
Additional mix and recording by Peter Iversen
Cover and artwork – Michael Rix and Jens Merch

Charts

References

1998 albums
Smokie (band) albums
Albums produced by Barry Beckett